Pseudocalopadia is a genus of lichen-forming fungi in the family Pilocarpaceae. The genus was circumscribed in 1999 by lichenologist Robert Lücking, with Pseudocalopadia mira as the type, and at the time, only species. P. chibaensis was added to the genus in 2017.

References

Pilocarpaceae
Lichen genera
Lecanorales genera
Taxa named by Robert Lücking
Taxa described in 1999